Dub is a village in the municipality of Travnik, Bosnia and Herzegovina.

It is located close to the Vlašić mountain.

Demographics 
According to the 2013 census, its population was 988.

References

Populated places in Travnik